The 1886 Delaware gubernatorial election was held on November 2, 1886. Incumbent Democratic Governor Charles C. Stockley was barred from seeing a second consecutive term in office. Former Congressman Benjamin T. Biggs won the Democratic nomination to succeed Stockley. The Republican Party, which was weak and practically nonexistent in the state at the time, did not run a candidate for Governor. As a result, the Temperance Reform Party briefly supplanted the Republican Party as the primary opposition to the Democratic Party. Former State Representative and Smyrna Town Treasurer John H. Hoffecker, a former Democrat, emerged as the Temperance Reform nominee. However, the Democratic Party remained strong in the state; with no Republican opponent and only weak opposition, Biggs won in a landslide.

Temperance Reform convention
At the Temperance Reform convention in Dover in June 1886, John H. Hoffecker received the party's nomination by acclamation.

Democratic convention
At the Democratic convention in Dover in August 1886, former Congressman Benjamin T. Biggs entered as the frontrunner. He faced a number of prospective candidates, including:

 Edwin R. Cochran, New Castle County Clerk of the Peace, former State Representative
 William Herbert, New Castle County Treasurer
 Swithin Chandler
 J. Wilkins Cooch, former State Senator

Despite the fierce competition, however, Biggs was easily nominated, winning the convention vote on the first ballot.

General election

References

Bibliography
 Delaware Senate Journal, 81st General Assembly, 1st Reg. Sess. (1887).

1886
Delaware
Gubernatorial
November 1886 events